Out of the Everywhere, and Other Extraordinary Visions is a short story collection by American writer James Tiptree, Jr, first published in 1981 as a Del Rey Books paperback original. All but two of the stories had been previously published, four of them under the pseudonym Raccoona Sheldon (as opposed to Tiptree, also a pseudonym).

Contents
 "Angel Fix" (1974, as Sheldon)
 "Beaver Tears" (1976, as Sheldon)
 "Your Faces, O My Sisters! Your Faces Filled of Light!" (1976, as Sheldon)
 "The Screwfly Solution" (winner of the Nebula Award for novelette in 1978) (1977, as Sheldon)
 "Time-Sharing Angel" (1977)
 "We Who Stole the Dream" (1978)
 "Slow Music" (1980)
 "A Source of Innocent Merriment" (1980)
 Out of the Everywhere (1981, winner of the Seiun Award for overseas short fiction in 2000)
 With Delicate Mad Hands (1981, winner of the Hayakawa Award for foreign short story in 1993)

See also

 Out of the Everywhere - Collection of science essays by Isaac Asimov.

External links
 

Short story collections by James Tiptree Jr.
1981 short story collections
Del Rey books